Langeberg is a mountain range in the Western Cape province of South Africa.

Langeberg may also refer to:

Langeberg Local Municipality, Western Cape, South Africa
Swen Langeberg or Swen Nater (born 1950), Dutch basketball player

See also
Langberg, surname
Langenberg (disambiguation)